The 2016 American Athletic Conference women's soccer tournament is the postseason women's soccer tournament for the American Athletic Conference held from November 2 to 6, 2016. The five match tournament was held at Morrone Stadium, home field of the regular season champion Connecticut Huskies in Storrs, Connecticut. The six team single-elimination tournament consists of three rounds based on seeding from regular season conference play. The Cincinnati Bearcats were the defending tournament champions, after defeating the USF Bulls in a penalty kick shootout in the championship match the previous year.

Bracket

Schedule

First round

Semifinals

Final

References 
2016 American Athletic Conference Women's Soccer Championship

 
American Athletic Conference Women's Soccer Tournament
American Athletic Conference Women's Soccer Tournament
American Athletic Conference Women's Soccer Tournament